Clemente Romero (born November 25, 1984) is a businessman, speaker and author. He is the executive director of the staffing company Paisclo Solutions Corp and president of the Urban Latino Records record label.

He has been recognized in the United States as Entrepreneur of the Year 2022, for his contribution to the Latino community residing in the North American country.

Trajectory 
In that Institution he managed to be promoted to Company Inspection Prosecutor in 2004 and in 2006 he was promoted as Company Inspection Manager where in 2008 he received important recognition for the implementation of a new methodology for the inspection of company payrolls.

For his work and performance in Venezuela, in 2013 he received the Mara de Oro as the best recruitment and hiring consultant with international projection.

Later, in 2014, he emigrated to the United States and had his first job in a hotel where he held various positions, until he became a human resources manager.

In 2016 he founded his first company, C&A Staffing, together with other people. The pandemic forced them to cease operations in 2020. However, in that same year, Clemente Romero founded Paisclo Solutions Corp in Florida. Quickly, he achieved effective growth, eventually opening two branches: one in Miami and one in Tampa.

After this event, he founded the Urban Latino Records record label, where the artists John Theis and Sagcy are represented.

Awards and honours 
 2013: Mara de Oro: Excellence Award as Best Consultant in Recruitment and Contracting with International Projection 
 2022: Leg Marketing: Best Latino Entrepreneur of 2022 Award

References 

Venezuelan emigrants to the United States
Venezuelan businesspeople
1984 births
Living people
People from Maracaibo